Dietrich-Bowen House, also known as Governor Bowen House, is a historic home located at Bremen, Marshall County, Indiana.  It was built in 1900, and is a -story, Queen Anne style brick dwelling.  It rests on a fieldstone foundation and has a truncated hipped roof with gable dormer.  The house features corner turrets with conical roofs and a large verandah with the roof supported by iron grill work.  It was the home of Governor Otis R. Bowen from 1953 to 1973.

It was listed on the National Register of Historic Places in 1978.

References

Houses on the National Register of Historic Places in Indiana
Queen Anne architecture in Indiana
Houses completed in 1900
Buildings and structures in Marshall County, Indiana
National Register of Historic Places in Marshall County, Indiana